Caulerpa cylindracea is a species of seaweed (green algae) in the Caulerpaceae family.

It is native to the Australian coast in a large area extending from around Perth north into the Mid West and Pilbara to the Kimberley region of Western Australia.

Caulerpa cylindracea was unintentionally introduced to the Mediterranean in the early 1990s, where it has spread extensively and is considered an invasive species. It is also considered invasive in South Australia where it can overgrow and out-compete native species.

References

cylindracea
Species described in 1845